This is a list of the seasons played by Slovan Bratislava. The club's achievements in all major national and international competitions as well as the top scorers are listed. The list is separated into two parts, coinciding with the two major episodes of (Czecho-)Slovak football:
 From 1945–93 Slovan was part of the Czechoslovak league
 Since 1993 after the dissolution of Czechoslovakia Slovan has been taking part in the Slovak league

Key

Key to colours and symbols:

Key to league record:
 Pld = Matches played
 W = Matches won
 D = Matches drawn
 L = Matches lost
 GF = Goals scored
 GA = Goals against
 Pts = Points
 % = Percentage of points earned out of the total possible number of points
 Pos = Final position

Key to cup record:
 NH = Not held
 QR = Qualifying round
 QR1 = First qualifying round
 QR2 = Second qualifying round, etc.
 PO = Play-off round
 GS = Group stage
 R1 = First round
 R2 = Second round, etc.
 R16 = Round of 16
 QF = Quarter-finals
 SF = Semi-finals
 RU = Runners-up
 W = Winners

1945–1993

Since 1993
Table correct as of 24 November 2022

References
 

Seasons
ŠK Slovan Bratislava seasons
Slovan Bratislava